The Mário Pimenta Camargo Municipal Park, or People's Park, was inaugurated on 28 September 2008, in the district of Itaim Bibi, in the district of Chácara Itaim, in São Paulo, Brazil.

The park 
It is an area of  that counts on a sports complex of three multisports courts with special marking for paralympic sports, green grass soccer field, cycling track skateboarding, walking, running track, a real-life chess game in which people can move the huge pieces in a checkered board on the ground, track and exercise equipment for the public to enjoy. In the grand open area of the lawn that is located in the central part, it is possible to sunbathe or picnic in the middle of the trees.

The Sensitive Garden, which has aromatic herbs, gives the public the opportunity to smell , touch or even taste some of the delicacies that grow in the garden, such as mustard, coriander, green odor, chives, aloe and basil. The place has full accessibility for people with reduced mobility, made with materials recovered from demolitions carried out by the city for the construction of its sidewalks, such as the recyclable waste of buildings found in the central region of the city of São Paulo.

See also 
Villa-Lobos State Park

References 

Parks in São Paulo
Tourist attractions in São Paulo (state)